Jana Preissová (née Drchalová; born 7 February 1948) is a Czech film and stage actress. She won a Czech Lion for Best Supporting Actress at the 1994 Czech Lion Awards, for her role in the film Řád.

Selected filmography
Capricious Summer (1968)
Crime in a Music Hall (1968)
 Jak vytrhnout velrybě stoličku (1976)
Jak dostat tatínka do polepšovny (1978)
Dobrá čtvrť (television, 2005–2008)

References

External links

1948 births
Living people
Czech film actresses
Czech stage actresses
Czech television actresses
Czechoslovak film actresses
Actors from Plzeň
20th-century Czech actresses
21st-century Czech actresses
Czech Lion Awards winners